Carlos César Maldonado Delgado (born October 18, 1966) is a former pitcher in Major League Baseball. He won two games in the majors (both in 1993) and on August 15, 1993, he recorded the only save of his MLB career. He pitched a scoreless ninth inning to nail down a 6-4 Brewers win over the Tigers.

References

Sources

1966 births
Living people
Kansas City Royals players
Major League Baseball pitchers
Major League Baseball players from Panama
Milwaukee Brewers players
Panamanian expatriate baseball players in the United States
People from Chepo District